Landscape with a Carriage and a Train is an oil painting by Vincent van Gogh that he painted in June 1890 when he lived in Auvers-sur-Oise, France.

Background 
Van Gogh spent the last few months of his life in Auvers-sur-Oise, a small town just north of Paris, after he left an asylum at Saint-Rémy in May 1890. He made the painting in the week following his portraits of Dr. Gachet. The viewpoint from above was a favourite perspective of his since his days sketching in the dunes of Scheveningen at The Hague with the aid of a perspective frame.

Van Gogh described the painting in a letter to his sister Wil:

The painting is in the collection of the  Pushkin Museum of Fine Arts, Moscow.

See also
List of works by Vincent van Gogh

Works

Letters

References

Bibliography
 de la Faille, Jacob-Baart. The Works of Vincent van Gogh: His Paintings and Drawings. Amsterdam: Meulenhoff, 1970. 
 Hulsker, Jan. The Complete Van Gogh. Oxford: Phaidon, 1980. 
 Naifeh, Steven; Smith, Gregory White. Van Gogh: The Life. Profile Books, 2011. 
 van der Veen, Wouter; Knapp, Peter. Van Gogh in Auvers: His Last Days. Monacelli Press, 2010.

External links

Paintings by Vincent van Gogh
Paintings of Auvers-sur-Oise by Vincent van Gogh
1890 paintings
Farming in art
Trains in art
Horses in art